Świętojańsko is a village in the administrative district of Gmina Krzeszyce, within Sulęcin County, Lubusz Voivodeship, in western Poland.

The village has a population of 60.

External links 
 Jewish Community in Świętojańsko on Virtual Shtetl

References

Villages in Sulęcin County